Almolonga is a town, with a population of 12,299 (2018 census), and a municipality in the Quetzaltenango Department of Guatemala, located on the road between Ciudad de Quetzaltenango (Quetzaltenango City) and Zunil. Its population is primarily indigenous, speaking the Kʼicheʼ (Quiché) language

The town is known as the "Vegetable Basket of the Americas" (La Hortaliza de las Américas) due to the intense cultivation of vegetables in its vicinity. Tourist attractions include nearby thermal baths and Paradise Valley.

The belief that An Evangelical church formed in Almolonga in the 1970s which gave the population of the town valuable infrastructure that allow the town to harvest crops more successfully is untrue. The town is often used as an example of how transnational interference can help develop communities but scholars and citizens challenge this. 
The town still has a large population of migrant youth, alcoholism, and poverty. The average monthly household income is US$105 for an average of six person household. Almolonguneses work from sun up to sun down in very hazardous working conditions. The town relies heavily on pesticides. There is still some argument of what percentage of the town follows Evangelicalism and is often cited as a place of revival.

References

Municipalities of the Quetzaltenango Department

pt:Almolonga